The following lists events that happened during 1957 in Colony of Singapore.

Incumbents
 Governor:
 until 9 December: Sir Robert Brown Black
 starting 9 December: Sir William Goode
 Chief Minister: Lim Yew Hock
 Chief Secretary: 
 until 9 December: Sir William Goode

Events

March
 11 March - The second Merdeka Talks took place.
 21 March - The Singapore Industrial Promotion Board was formed to develop various industries in colonial Singapore.

April
 27 April - The first Pontianak film was released, establishing the horror genre in the local film industry.

June
 29 June - By-elections in two constituencies were held, with Lee Kuan Yew winning his seat and Soh Ghee Soon from the Liberal Socialist Party winning the other.

July
 1 July - The Berita Harian is launched.

November
 1 November - The Citizenship Ordinance in 1957 commenced with registration of Singapore citizenship.
 3 November - The Workers' Party is launched.

December
 21 December - The City Council elections was held, with the People's Action Party winning a majority of the seats.
 24 December - Ong Eng Guan is sworn in as the first Mayor of Singapore.

Births
 14 January - V. K. Rajah, former Attorney-General of Singapore.
 25 February - Tharman Shanmugaratnam, Senior Minister of Singapore.
 1 August - Davinder Singh, lawyer.
 24 September - Lee Hsien Yang, business executive.
 George Quek, founder of BreadTalk.

Deaths
 1 January - Lim Boon Keng - Doctor, reformer (b. 1869).

References

 
Singapore
Years in Singapore